Zhongshan is a prefecture-level city in Guangdong province, People's Republic of China.

Zhongshan may also refer to:

People 

 Sun Yat-sen (1866–1925) or Sun Zhongshan, Chinese politician and the founding father of the Republic of China
Zhongshan suit, a type of clothing
Sun Yat-sen University, in Guangzhou, Guangdong
, named after Dr. Sun Yat-sen in 1925

 Zhong Shan (born 1955), male Chinese politician, Minister of Commerce of the People's Republic of China

Places 
Zhongshan (state), of the Zhou Dynasty
 Zhongshan County, Guangxi
 Zhongshan District, Liupanshui, Guizhou
 Zhongshan District, Dalian, Liaoning
 Zhongshan Square
 Zhongshan Park Subdistrict, Shahekou District, Dalian, Liaoning
 Zhongshan District, Keelung, Taiwan
 Zhongshan District, Taipei, Taiwan
 Zhongshan metro station
 Zhongshan Island, Guangdong
 Zhongshan Park, several uses
 List of streets named after Sun Yat-sen
North Zhongshan Road station, Shanghai Metro
Purple Mountain (Nanjing), also known as Zhongshan, Nanjing, Jiangsu
Zhongshan Station (Antarctica), a Chinese Antarctic research station

Other uses 
Zhongshan Kingdom (Han dynasty), a Han dynasty kingdom

See also

Chung Shan (disambiguation)
, Japanese surname written with the same Chinese characters as "Zhongshan", and the inspiration for Sun Yatsen's choice of nom de guerre
Zhongshan Park Station (disambiguation)
Zhongshan Station (disambiguation)